Hip-Hop Forever III is the third compilation album in the "Hip-Hop Forever" series by DJ Jazzy Jeff, an American hip hop producer. The mix is available with or without an accompanying unmixed disc containing the same tracks.

Track listing

Disc one:  DJ Mix
 "Tear Shit Up"
 Performed by Biz Markie
 Featuring DJ Jazzy Jeff
 "Passing Me By"
 Performed by Pharcyde
 "Whatever You Say"
 Performed by Little Brother
 "IJusWannaChill"
 Performed by Large Professor
 "Top Ten List"
 Performed by Masta Ace
 "Visualize"
 Performed by Mr Complex
 "Speed"
 Performed by Little Brother
 "Ebonics"
 Performed by Big L
 "Play Dis [Clean]"
 Performed by Saukrates
 "Players"
 Performed by Slum Village
 "Runnin'"
 Performed by Pharcyde
 "Fuck The Police"
 Performed by Jay Dee
 "Eric B. Is President"
 Performed by Eric B. & Rakim
 "Droppin' Science"
 Performed by Marley Marl
 "The ? Remains"
 Performed by Gang Starr
 "Mass Appeal"
 Performed by Gang Starr
 "Full Clip"
 Performed by Gang Starr
 "Boom"
 Performed by Royce Da 5'9"
 "Award Tour"
 Performed by A Tribe Called Quest
 "Don't Nobody Care About Us"
 Performed by Phat Kat
 "Quiet Storm"
 Performed by Mobb Deep
 "Who Got Da Props?"
 Performed by Black Moon
 "Let's Get Dirty (I Can't Get In Da Club)"
 Performed by Redman
 Featuring DJ Kool
 "Choice Is Yours"
 Performed by Black Sheep
 "Lookin' At The Front Door"
 Performed by Main Source
 "Them That Not"
 Performed by J-Live

Disc two: Unmixed Disc
 "Boom"
 Performed by Royce Da 5'9"
 Produced by DJ Premier
 "The Best Part"
 Performed by J-Live
 Produced by DJ Premier
 "Them That's Not"
 Performed by J-Live
 Produced by J-Live, Grap Luva
 "Don't Nobody Care About Us"
 Performed by Phat Kat
 Produced by Jay Dee
 "Who Got The Props"
 Performed by Black Moon
 Produced by Da Beatminerz
 "Looking At The Front Door"
 Performed by Main Source
 Produced by Main Source
 "Top 10 List"
 Performed by Masta Ace
 Produced by Saukrates
 "Tear Shit Up"
 Performed by Biz Markie
 Produced by M. Hall
 "Visualize"
 Performed by Mr. Complex
 Produced by DJ Spinna
 "Quiet Storm"
 Performed by Mobb Deep
 Produced by Havoc
 "Eric B Is President"
 Performed by Eric B & Rakim
 Produced by Eric B & Rakim
 "Choice Is Yours"
 Performed by Black Sheep
 Produced by Black Sheep
 "Let's Get Dirty"
 Performed by Redman
 Produced by Rockwilder
 "Ebonics"
 Performed by Big L
 Produced by Ron Browz
 "Mass Appeal"
 Performed by Gang Starr
 Produced by DJ Premier
 "The ? Remains"
 Performed by Gang Starr
 Produced by DJ Premier
 "Players"
 Performed by Slum Village
 Produced by Jay Dee
 "Too Complex"
 Performed by L Da Head Toucha
 Produced by Vinyl Reanimators
 "Treat 'Em Right"
 Performed by Chubb Rock
 Produced by Howie Tee

External links
 DJ Jazzy Jeff official site
 DJ Jazzy Jeff on MySpace
 DJ Jazzy Jeff on BBE Records
 BBE Records official site

DJ Jazzy Jeff albums
2006 albums